Muhammad Aji Kurniawan (born July 1, 2000) is an Indonesian professional footballer who plays as a winger for Liga 1 club Persikabo 1973.

Club career

PSM Makassar
He was signed for PSM Makassar to play in Liga 1. Aji made his debut on 10 November 2019 in a match against Kalteng Putra. On 10 November 2019, Aji scored his first goal for PSM against Kalteng Putra in the 39th minute at the Tuah Pahoe Stadium, Palangkaraya.

Persijap Jepara (loan)
In 2021, Aji signed a contract with Indonesian Liga 2 club Persijap Jepara, on loan from PSM Makassar. He made his league debut on 27 September against Hizbul Wathan at the Manahan Stadium, Surakarta.

Persikabo 1973
Aji was signed for Persikabo 1973 to play in Liga 1 in the 2022–23 season. He made his league debut on 25 July 2022 in a match against Persebaya Surabaya at the Pakansari Stadium, Cibinong.

Career statistics

Club

Notes

References

External links
 Aji Kurniawan at Soccerway
 Aji Kurniawan at Liga Indonesia

2000 births
Living people
Indonesian footballers
Liga 2 (Indonesia) players
Liga 1 (Indonesia) players
PSM Makassar players
Persijap Jepara players
Persikabo 1973 players
Association football midfielders
Sportspeople from South Sulawesi